The Swedish Gold Coast was a colony of the Swedish Africa Company founded in 1650 by Hendrik Carloff on the Gulf of Guinea in present-day Ghana in Africa. Under foreign occupation for much of its existence, it disappeared for good in April 1663 when it became part of the Dutch Gold Coast.

History
Following the foundation of the Swedish Africa Company (1649) by Louis de Geer an expedition under the command of Hendrik Carloff was sent to Africa in 1650. Carloff made a treaty with the Akan King of Futu (also Feta) on selling some areas of land. On 22 April 1650 the Swedish Gold Coast was founded and Carloff became its first administrator. In 1652 the foundations were laid of the fort Carlsborg

In 1656 Johan Filip von Krusenstierna (brother of the great-grandfather of Adam Johann von Krusenstern) was appointed the new Governor. This enraged Carloff. He left Cabo Corso only to return on 27 January 1658 on the Danish Privateer Glückstadt. Fort Carlsborg was seized and made part of the Danish Gold Coast colony.

King Charles X Gustav of Sweden made this one of his reasons to go to war with Denmark-Norway. After the Treaty of Copenhagen in 1660, Cabo Corso Castle was to be returned to Swedish administration: However it then was revealed that Carloff's associate Samuel Schmidt (Smith, Smit) had already illegally sold the colony in April 1659 to the Dutch West India Company on his own, and had disappeared with the gold to Angola.

Later on the local population started a successful uprising against their new masters and in December 1660 the King of the Akan people subgroup-Futu again offered Sweden control over the area. A new expedition was sent to the colony which remained under Swedish administration only for a short period. Von Krusenstierna was reappointed as administrator.

On 20 April 1663 Fort Carlsborg and the capital Fort Christiansborg were again seized by the Dutch after a long defense under the Swedish commander Anton (Tönnies) Voss.

On 9 May 1664 the Dutch controlled area again was seized by Robert Holmes who made it part of the British Gold Coast colony. Swedish claims to the colony were later formally relinquished in the 1667 Treaty of Breda.

Geography
The colony consisted of only a few forts and trading posts scattered around Cabo Corso (present-day Cape Coast) along the coast on the Gulf of Guinea in what later would become the British Gold Coast then Ghana. The eastern section of the colony later swapped hands from the German Empire (where it had noticeably expanded northward) to France, and then later gained independence as Togo.

The colony consisted of fortifications and trading posts (factories):

 Fort Carlsborg (also Carolusborg and Cape Coast Castle), present day Cape Coast, Central Region, under Swedish administration 22 April 1650 – January/February 1658, 10 December 1660 – 22 April 1663.
Fort William (also Annamabo), present day Anomabu, Central region, under Swedish administration 1650 – 1657
Fort Batenstein (also Batensteyn), present day Butri near Sekondi-Takoradi, Western region, under Swedish administration 1650  – 1656
Fort Christiansborg (also Fort Frederiksborg and Osu Castle), present day Osu, Ghana in Accra, headquarters, under Swedish administration 1652 – 1658
Fort Witsen (also Taccorari), present day Sekondi-Takoradi, Western region, under Swedish administration 1653 – 1658
 Fort Apollonia, present day Beyin, Western region, under Swedish administration 1655 – 1657
Gemoree Factory
 Accara Factory

Colonial heads
Each of the three Swedish administrators had a different gubernatorial title:

 Director: Hendrik Carloff, 22 April 1650 – 1655
 Governor: Johann Philipp von Krusenstjerna (son of Philipp Crusius), 1655 – 27 Jan 1658
 Danish occupation: 27 Jan 1658 – Mar 1659
 Dutch occupation: Mar 1659 – 10 Dec 1660
 Futu occupation (nominally Swedish): 10 Dec 1660 – 1662
 Commander: Tönnies Voss 16 Mar 1662 – 22 Apr 1663

References

Sources
 WorldStatesmen.org: Swedish Gold Coast
 about the forts

History of Ghana
Former colonies in Africa
Gold Coast
Swedish colonisation in Africa
Cape Coast
17th century in Ghana
1650s in Africa
1660s in Africa
States and territories established in 1650
States and territories disestablished in 1663
1650 establishments in Africa
1663 disestablishments in Africa
1650 establishments in the Swedish colonial empire
1658 disestablishments in the Swedish colonial empire
1660 establishments in the Swedish colonial empire
1663 disestablishments in the Swedish colonial empire
History of West Africa
Ghana–Sweden relations